Jiří (YI-RZHEE), the Czech is a masculine given name, equivalent to English George, may refer to:

Given name

B

Jiří Antonín Benda
Jiří Baborovský
Jiří Barta
Jiří Bartoška
Jiří Bicek
Jiří Bobok
Jiří Bubla
Jiří Buquoy
Jiří Bělohlávek
Jiří Brdečka
Jiří Březina

C

Jiří Čeřovský
Jiří Čunek
Jiří Crha

D

Jiří Dopita
Jiří Družecký (1745–1819), Bohemian-born Austrian composer and timpanist
Jiří Dudáček
Jiří Džmura

F

Jiří Fischer

G

Jiří Grossmann
Jiří Gruša
Jiří Grygar

H

Jiří Hanke
Jiří Hájek
Jiří Hála
Jiří Hledík
Jiří Holeček
Jiří Holík
Jiří Homola
Jiří Horák
Jiří Hrdina
Jiří Hřebec
Jiří Hudec
Jiří Hudec (composer)
Jiří Hudler

J

Jiří Jantovsky
Jiří Jarošík
Jiri Jelinek (born 1977), Czech dancer
Jiří Jeslínek (disambiguation)
Jiří Jeslínek (footballer, born 1962)
Jiří Jeslínek (footballer, born 1987)
Jiří Jirmal

K

Jiří Kaufman
Jiří Kavan
Jiří Kylián
Jiří Kladrubský
Jiří Kochta
Jiří Kolář
Jiří Korn
Jiří Koubský
Jiří Kristián z Lobkowicz
Jiří Králík
Jiří Kulhánek
Jiří Kylián

L

Jiří Lábus
Jiří Lála
Jiří Látal
Jiří Lenko
Jiri Lev
Jiří Levý
Jiří Ignác Línek (1725–1791), Bohemian late-Baroque composer
Jiří Lobkowicz

M

Jiři Mádl (born 1986), Czech film actor
Jiří Mahen
Jiří Malec
Jiří Malysa (born 1966), Czech race walker
Jiří Mašek
Jiří Maštálka
Jiří Menzel
Jiří Mucha
Jiří Mužík

N

Jiří Nigrin
Jiri Novotny (disambiguation)
Jiří Novotný (footballer)
Jiří Novotný (ice hockey)
Jiří Novák (born 1975), tennis player
Jiří Tibor Novak (born 1947), Czech-born Australian artist, illustrator, and writer
Jiří Němec

O

Jiří Orten

P

Jiří Parma
Jiří Paroubek
Jiří Pauer
Jiří Pelikán (disambiguation)
Jiří Pelikán (chess player)
Jiří Pelikán (politician)
Jiří Petr
Jiří Pešek
Jiří z Poděbrad, George of Kunštát and Poděbrady (1420–1471), (German: Georg von Podiebrad), was King of Bohemia (1458–1471)
Jiří Pospíšil
Jiří Poukar
Jiří Procházka

R

Jiří Raška
Jiří Rohan
Jiří Rosický (disambiguation)
Jiří Rosický (footballer, born 1948)
Jiří Rosický (footballer, born 1977)
Jiří Ryba

S

Jiří Sabou
Jiří Šejba
Jiří Sequens
Jiří Skobla
Jiří Šlégr
Jiří Snítil
Jiří Sovák
Jiří Štajner
Jiří Štancl
Jiří Stivín
Jiří Stříbrný (1880–1955), Czech politician
Jiří Suchý

T

Jiří Teplý
Jiří Tichý
Jiří Tlustý
Jiří Tožička
Jiří Trnka
Jiří Třanovský

V

Jiří Vaněk (disambiguation)
Jiří Vaněk (rower)
Jiří Vaněk (tennis)
Jiří Veselý
Jiří Voskovec
Jiří Votruba

W

Jiří Wachsmann
Jiří Weil (1900–1959) Czech Jewish writer and novelist
Jiří Welsch
Jiří Wolker

Z

Jiří Zelenka
Jiri Zidek (paleontologist), contemporary Czech paleontologist
George Zidek (b. Jiří Zídek, 1973), basketball player

Other uses
Jiří Paroubek's Cabinet
Jiřího z Poděbrad, Prague Metro station
Jiříkov, town in the Czech Republic

See also 
 
 Jiri (disambiguation)
 Jiřina (disambiguation)
 George (given name)
 List of Czechs

Czech masculine given names